The Ghouls (also known as Cannibal Dead: The Ghouls) is a 2003 independent American horror film that was written and directed by Chad Ferrin.

Plot
Eric Hayes (Timothy Muskatell) makes his living as a news stringer finding gruesome atrocities and filming them to sell to the media. One night, he stumbles upon some ghouls devouring a young woman in an alley. After discovering that he did not have any film in his camera, Hayes convinces his friend Clift (Trent Haaga) to help him track down the ghouls again.

Cast
 Timothy Muskatell as Eric Hayes
 Trent Haaga as Clift
 Tina Birchfield as Sue
 Gil Espinoza as Juan
 Casey Powell as Benny
 James Gunn as Detective Cotton
 Stephen Blackehart as Police Detective
 Joseph Pilato as Lewis (Joseph Rhodes)
 Ernest M. Garcia as Mr. Wollen (E.M. Garcia)
 Marina Blumenthal as Jessica 
 Scott Vogel as Bunuel
 Tiffany Shepis as Ghoul Victim
 Jessica Garcia as Prostitute 
 Patrick Floch as The Bartender
 John Santos as Ghoul
 Richard Steele as Ghoul
 Carlo Corazon as Ghoul
 Scott Vogel as Ghoul
 Sharkey Schmit as Ghoul
 Chad Ferrin as Father (uncredited)

Production 
The film was independently produced and shot guerrilla style in Los Angeles on Mini DV for $15,000.

Reception

The Ghouls has been described as "a no-budget horror opus" and a "vicious cross between Paparazzi and Kolchak: The Night Stalker".

The film won the 2003 "Sinners Award" at the Saints and Sinners Film Festival.

References

External links
The Ghouls review Dread Central
The Ghouls review at cinemafantastique 
 
 

2003 films
2003 independent films
2003 horror films
American independent films
Films directed by Chad Ferrin
Syfy original films
2000s English-language films
2000s American films
American horror films